Alexander Johnston (7 December 1881 – 19 March 1965) was an Australian rules footballer who played for the Carlton Football Club and Richmond Football Club in the Victorian Football League (VFL).

Notes

External links 
		
Alex Johnston's profile at Blueseum

1881 births
1965 deaths
Australian rules footballers from Victoria (Australia)
North Melbourne Football Club (VFA) players
Carlton Football Club players
Richmond Football Club players